The Community Security Initiative (CSI) was a project of the OSCE in Kyrgyzstan that aimed to help the country's police in their activities. The project was established following the 2010 South Kyrgyzstan ethnic clashes. The main objective of the CSI was "to increase the respect for and protection of human rights by the police and to build confidence between law enforcement agencies and communities including through the promotion of multi-ethnic policing."

The CSI was approved in November 2010 by all OSCE participating states. The project was officially ended on 11 December 2015.

History 
The Community Security Initiative was developed at the request of the government of Kyrgyzstan and approved by a decision of the OSCE Permanent Council on 18 November 2010. The main goal of the project was to support Kyrgyzstan's police in dealing with the security situation following the 2010 South Kyrgyzstan ethnic clashes and to assist in the police reform process. Markus Mueller of Switzerland (2010-2013), Todor Staykov of Bulgaria (2013-2014), Robin Seaword of the UK (2014), and Patrick McNulty of the US (2015) served as head of the CSI. In the fall of 2014, the government of Kyrgyzstan decided to close the CSI project. However, it was extended for another year. The CSI was officially closed on 11 December 2015.

Activities 
As part of the project, the OSCE sent unarmed police advisers to several districts across Kyrgyzstan and donated 18 mobile police receptions—minivans with basic equipment needed for a mobile police reception—to re-establish and increase police presence in remote areas. In 2011–2015, over 80,000 people approached the mobile police receptions. 

The CSI project also organized over 150 trainings for police officers to improve their professionalism. In addition, the CSI closely monitored and supported the activities of local crime prevention centers and neighborhood inspectors to increase their efficiency in addressing security issues and everyday concerns of citizens. The CSI also promoted youth empowerment and education by providing opportunities for young people to learn about school bullying and racketeering, as well as ethnic tolerance, career building, and prevention of bad habits.

The project worked in collaboration with the OSCE's Police Reform Programme and High Commissioner on National Minorities (HCNM). The project also collaborated with a large number of national authorities in Kyrgyzstan, including the Ombudsman, Prosecutor General, the State Penitentiary Service, the Ministry of Interior, the Ministry of Justice, and the Ministry of Health. 

The CSI received €7 million worth of financing from the European Union and 21 OSCE participating states, including Andorra, Austria, Belgium, Canada, Denmark, Finland, France, Germany, Hungary, Ireland, Kazakhstan, Liechtenstein, Lithuania, Luxembourg, Norway, Sweden, Switzerland, Turkey, the United Kingdom and the United States.

Areas of operation 

The CSI was present in the following districts and cities across Kyrgyzstan:

Batken Region
Batken District
Leilek District
Kyzyl-Kiya City

Chuy Region
Chuy District
Jayyl District
Jalal-Abad Region
Bazar-Korgon District
Nooken District
Suzak District
Toguz-Toro District
Jalal-Abad City

Osh Region
Aravan District
Kara-Suu District
Nookat District
Uzgen District
Osh City

References

External links 

 A photo gallery of CSI activities
 An OSCE documentary about the CSI

Organization for Security and Co-operation in Europe
Government of Kyrgyzstan